Euphorbia serpyllifolia (Euphorbia serpillifolia) is a species of euphorb known by the common names thymeleaf sandmat or thyme-leafed spurge. It is native to a large part of North America from Canada to Mexico, where it is a common member of the flora in many types of habitat. This is an annual herb growing as a prostrate mat or taking a somewhat erect form. The oblong leaves are up to about 1.5 centimeters long, sometimes hairy and finely toothed along the edges. The tiny inflorescence is a cyathium about a millimeter wide. It bears scalloped white petal-like appendages arranged around the actual flowers. At the center are several male flowers and one female flower, which develops into a lobed, oval fruit up to 2 millimeters wide. This plant had a number of traditional medicinal uses for many Native American groups.

Subspecies 
Euphorbia serpyllifolia subsp. hirtula is limited to California and Baja California.
Euphorbia serpyllifolia subsp. serpyllifolia has far wider distribution throughout much of North America with a gap in interior eastern states of the United States.

Uses
The Zuni people use it as a cathartic, an emetic, and to increase the flow of milk in a breastfeeding mother. The leaves are used to sweeten corn meal and chewed for the pleasant taste.

Notes

References

External links
Jepson Manual Treatment
Photo gallery at CalPhotos

serpyllifolia
Flora of the Southwestern United States
Plants used in Native American cuisine
Plants used in traditional Native American medicine
Spices